Kempinski Hotels S.A., commonly known as Kempinski, is a luxury hotel management company headquartered in Geneva, Switzerland. Founded in Berlin in 1897 as the Hotelbetriebs-Aktiengesellschaft, the group currently operates 78 five-star hotels and residences in 34 countries.

History 

Kempinski Hotels claims to be Europe's oldest luxury hotel group. Its history began in 1897 with the foundation of the "Hotelbetriebs-Aktiengesellschaft" in Berlin. A parallel development was that of M. Kempinski & Co, founded by Berthold Kempinski, which was acquired by the "Hotelbetriebs-Aktiengesellschaft" in 1953.

Berthold Kempinski was born on 10 October 1843 in Posen (then a German province, and now Poland). The Kempinski family was already successfully active in the wine trade from 1862. In 1872 it extended its company to Berlin, where Berthold Kempinski opened a wine merchant's business under his name in the Friedrichstraße. In 1889 he opened a restaurant, the biggest in Berlin, in the Leipziger Straße.

Since Berthold Kempinski and his wife Helena had no son, they invited their son-in-law Richard Unger (1866–1947) to join the business. Berthold Kempinski finally transferred the firm to his son-in-law on condition that he kept the name Kempinski. Berthold Kempinski died on March 14, 1910.

Alongside his wine and restaurant activities, Richard Unger developed his property business up to the start of World War I. After a short period of stagnation during the War, he sold products of his own manufacture under the brand name Kempinski. The business in Berlin flourished so that in 1918, a Kempinski hotel dependency was established at 27 Kurfürstendamm, where the Kempinski Hotel Bristol now stands. Ten years later, M. Kempinski & Co. took over the "Haus Vaterland" on the Potsdamer Platz, where the firm exploited a concept that was unique in Berlin for a long time and is still known as "event gastronomy" ("Erlebnisgastronomie").

To escape the events of World War II, Richard Unger and his family emigrated to the United States and the firm M. Kempinski & Co became part of Aschinger AG.

The Restaurant at 27 Kurfürstendamm was destroyed by fire shortly before the end of the War, and the other properties fell victim to bombing raids. After the end of the conflict, Richard Unger's son and Berthold Kempinski's grandson, Dr Friedrich Unger, returned to Germany. In 1951 construction started on a hotel on the site of the ruined restaurant at 27 Kurfürstendamm, and it opened a year later under the name Hotel Kempinski. For 20 years the modern, progressive five-star hotel enjoyed the undisputed status of the sole luxury hotel in Berlin.

In 1953 Dr Friedrich Unger sold his shares and the name Kempinski to the "Hotelbetriebs-Aktiengesellschaft", which already ran hotels such as the Baltic, the Bristol and the Kaiserhof. The name Bristol was adopted and is still used at the Kempinski Hotel at 27 Kurfürstendamm. In subsequent years, the "Hotelbetriebs-Aktiengesellschaft" took over the management of several famous hotels. In 1957 it acquired the luxurious Hotel Atlantic in Hamburg.

In 1970 the General Assembly of the "Hotelbetriebs-Aktiengesellschaft" voted to change its name to "Kempinski Hotelbetriebs-Aktiengesellschaft". In the same year, a long-lasting partnership was established with Lufthansa in the form of a 50-per cent participation in the Hotel Vier Jahreszeiten in Munich, in which Lufthansa already had a holding. In 1977 the hotel company received its present name as "Kempinski Aktiengesellschaft (AG)". At the same time, the Kempinski Hotel Frankfurt Gravenbruch was added to the group's portfolio as its fourth German hotel.

In 1985, Lufthansa acquired shares in Kempinski AG and thereby enabled the hotel company to operate Kempinski hotels abroad too. A year later, Kempinski AG, Lufthansa and the finance company Rolaco S.A. founded Kempinski Hotels S.A., with its head office in Geneva. In 1993 Kempinski AG acquired all the shares in Kempinski S.A.

The Bangkok-based Dusit Sindhorn Company Ltd took over Kempinski in November 1994, when it acquired a 52% stake. The 50:50 joint venture between Dusit Thani Group, and the Siam Commercial Bank eventually accumulated an 83% stake in the group, and Dusit Thani exited from the joint venture in 1998 when it sold out to its partner.

In February 2017, the two existing shareholders of Kempinski AG formalized previous plans for an equity transfer between them. The majority shares of Kempinski AG are held by the existing Bahraini shareholder while the shareholder from Thailand holds a minority.
In the same month, Kempinski announced the opening of its first luxury hotel in Cuba.

Kempinski Hotels worldwide 
Kempinski Hotels' portfolio currently comprises 78 hotels and residences worldwide, including the Hotel Adlon in Berlin, the Taschenbergpalais in Dresden, Hotel Indonesia Kempinski in Jakarta, the Kempinski Hotel Beijing Lufthansa Center in Beijing, the Çırağan Palace Kempinski in Istanbul, the Gran Hotel Manzana Kempinski La Habana in Cuba, the Kempinski Hotel Corvinus, Budapest, and the Kempinski Hotel Mall of the Emirates in Dubai, UAE and also Kempinski Hotel in Accra, Ghana.
Recently, the Kempinski chain opened a brand new hotel in Tel Aviv, Israel, complete with a full spa and restaurant in the hottest spot of the city.

In 2019, Kempinski officially opened its new branch in Nusa Dua, Bali, Indonesia with name The Apurva Kempinski Bali, remarking its second portfolio in Indonesia after Hotel Indonesia Kempinski in Jakarta.

With the exception of the Hotel Vier Jahreszeiten Kempinski in Munich, which belongs to the group, and three hotels with leasing contracts, Kempinski Hotels manages luxury hotels and residences.

Global Hotel Alliance 
Kempinski is a founding member of the Global Hotel Alliance (GHA) which was founded in Geneva in 2004. Members of GHA's DISCOVERY loyalty programme receive recognition and rewards across more than 570 hotels, resorts, palaces and spas in 35 brands of hotels across 85 countries.

Social responsibility 
As an internationally active company, Kempinski has introduced its own corporate social responsibility programme. In this respect the company is primarily committed in the areas of health and safety. In addition, individual Kempinski Hotels support social projects in specific locations to improve public welfare and justice locally.

BE Health 
Kempinski is a founding member of BE Health, a non-profit association, duly organised and existing under Swiss law, headquartered in Geneva, Switzerland. BE Health facilitates awareness-raising programmes, diagnosis and treatment of infectious diseases for its corporate sector members, their employees, families and local communities. Kempinski believes that business can make a positive impact in limiting the spread of infectious diseases. BE has the support of the WHO, The Global Fund, and many other well-known partners.

References

Further reading 
 "Second Swiss opening for Kempinski." Caterer and Hotelkeeper. 23 January 2003. Volume 192, Issue 4257, p. 8. Available at EBSCOHost.

External links 

 
 Global Hotel Alliance
 

Hotel chains
Hospitality companies established in 1897
Kempinski Hotels
Companies based in Geneva
1897 establishments in Germany
Hospitality companies of Switzerland
Hotels in Geneva